The 111th Aviation Regiment is an army aviation regiment of the United States Army and the Florida National Guard.

The Regiment was organized in the Florida Army National Guard as Company D, 26th Aviation Battalion and federally recognized on 1 September 1978 at Jacksonville. It was expanded, reorganized and redesignated on 2 October 1986 as the 419th Aviation Battalion, and redesignated on 1 October 1987 as the 111th Aviation, a parent regiment under the United States Army Regimental System to consist of the 1st Battalion at Jacksonville.

Structure
 1st Battalion (General Support)
 Headquarters and Headquarters Company
 Detachment 1
 Detachment 2
 Detachment 3 at Army Aviation Support Facility #2, General Lucius D. Clay National Guard Center (GA ARNG).
 Company A (UH-60M) at McEntire Joint National Guard Base (SC ARNG).
 Company B (CH-47F) at G.V. "Sonny" Montgomery National Guard Complex / Key Field Air National Guard Base (MS ARNG).
 Detachment 1 at Army Aviation Support Facility #1 Cecil Airport, (FL ARNG).
 Company C (Air Ambulance) (HH-60M), Army Aviation Support Facility #1, Cecil Airport (FL ARNG).
 Detachment 1 at Army Aviation Support Facility #2, General Lucius D. Clay National Guard Center (GA ARNG).
 Detachment 2 at Army Aviation Support Facility #1, Fort R. W. Shepherd Armory, (AL ARNG).
 Company D (CH-47)
 Detachment 1
 Detachment 2
 Detachment 3 at Army Aviation Support Facility #2, General Lucius D. Clay National Guard Center (GA ARNG).
 Company E
 Detachment 3 at Army Aviation Support Facility #2, General Lucius D. Clay National Guard Center (GA ARNG).
 Detachment 8 (IL ARNG)
 Company F (ATS), Aberdeen Proving Ground (Edgewood Area) (MD ARNG).
 Company G
 Detachment 2
 2nd Battalion (Airfield Operations), Camp Blanding, (FL ARNG)
 Company D
 Detachment 7

Deployments
 Company B (AH-64A) Afghanistan from June 2004 / HQ at Bagram part of Joint Task Force Wings (FL ARNG).

 Company C, Company D (MH-60L) Iraq from January 2011 / HQ at Tallil part of Operation New Dawn (FL, GA, VA ARNG).

See also
Coats of arms of U.S. Army Aviation Regiments
U.S. Army Regimental System (see Army Regulation 600-82)

References

Citations

Bibliography

Aviation regiments of the United States Army
Military units and formations established in 1987